Ngọc Hồi is a rural district (huyện) of Kon Tum province, in the Central Highlands region of Vietnam. As of 2003 the district had a population of 30,392. The district covers an area of 824 km². The district capital lies at Plei Kần.

References

Districts of Kon Tum province